"I Will Love You" is a song written by Shelby Flint and Barry DeVorzon. Flint recorded it as a track on her eponymous debut album in 1961.

In 1962, The Lettermen released their version of the song on their album Jim, Tony, and Bob.

In 1963, Richard Chamberlain released his version as the final single from his 1962 album Richard Chamberlain Sings. This version met with moderate success, placing on the Billboard Hot 100 at number 65.

Another remake was released in 1971, when Paige Claire included her version as a track on her eponymous debut album.

References

1963 singles
Richard Chamberlain songs
The Lettermen songs
Songs written by Barry De Vorzon
1961 songs
MGM Records singles
Songs written by Shelby Flint